A Feitian space suit is a Chinese spacesuit that was developed for the Shenzhou 7. Taikonaut Zhai Zhigang wore it during China's first-ever extra-vehicular activity (EVA) on 27 September 2008. Similarly, taikonaut Liu Boming also wore the Feitian space suit and assisted Zhai in the process.

The Feitian spacesuit was modelled after the Orlan-M spacesuit developed by Russia. The two are similar in shape and volume and are designed for spacewalks of up to seven hours, providing oxygen and allowing for the excretion of bodily waste.

The suit is reported to have cost $US4.4 million, and weighs . The name Fēi tiān literally and separately means "flying" and "sky" in Mandarin. It is a reference to the flying gods and goddesses feitian, sometimes translated as flying apsara, in Chinese, and most famously depicted in Chinese art in the grottoes of Dunhuang. Images of the feitian from Dunhuang appear on the arm badge of the space suit.

References

External links

Comparison of Feitian and Haiying suits

Spacesuits
Extravehicular activity